Santana N. Morris (born September 4, 1990) is Jamaican educator, education development specialist, motivational speaker, and Jamaica Youth Ambassador to the United Nations. Since 2016, she has worked to promote literacy and education, especially among children, across Jamaica. Morris is the current Executive Director of Jamaica Intensive Reading Clinic.

Early life and education
Santana Morris was born on 4 September 1990 in St. James, Jamaica. She was unable to speak until she was four years old. Her mother Marion and father Carlton helped her to learn how to read.

After completed the Grade Six Achievement Test (GSAT), Morris enrolled in Herbert Morrison Technical High School. She earned a diploma and a bachelor's degree in education at Shortwood Teachers' College with honors and her master's degree in management from the University of Technology, Jamaica. Morris earned a Professional Certificate from the International Centre for Parliamentary Studies in Strategic Economic Diplomacy in London.

Morris is currently pursuing her PhD in Leadership in the United States.

Career 
In 2016, Morris founded the Jamaica Intensive Reading Clinic with the aim of promoting literacy in Jamaica through five main components of literacy: fluency, comprehension skills, vocabulary development, phonemic development, and phonological development. That same year, she initiated an All Island Summer Reading Camp under the theme: "Revolutionizing Lives in the 21st Century Towards Holistic Development in Jamaica and the Caribbean Region" to benefit Jamaican children with literacy challenges. The Summer Reading Camp was first held in 2016 in seven Jamaican parishes.

In July 2017, Morris organized the second Summer Reading Camp with the aim of promoting literacy across Jamaica. In an interview for Caribbean Life, she said the following about the aim of the camp:

In October 2017, Morris became Jamaica Youth Ambassador to the United Nations with the role of "promoting youth advocacy and facilitating the participation of young people in decision-making". On 6 December 2017, she received the Prime Minister's Youth Awards for Excellence at the Jamaican Office of the Prime Minister. In September 2018, as Youth Ambassador, Morris launched a series of talks regarding safe spaces for Jamaican youth. The talks were held in numerous high schools and colleges in Jamaica under the theme "Preserving our Youth Through Strategic Intervention in Creating Safe Spaces in the 21st Century". During her tenure as Youth Ambassador, Morris called for the introduction of bilingual literacy teaching at the early childhood level in Jamaica, which was accepted by the Jamaican Ministry for Education.

In February 2019, Morris participated in TEDxUWIMona as a speaker.

Selected bibliography 
 
 
 
 
 
 
Alphabets in the Jamaican Context
Motivating Children to Master The Art of Reading
Building Moral and Social Values in Children's Lives
Keeping Control of your Daily Tasks Diary
Using Fine Line Strategy to Build Critical Thinking Skills

Awards and recognition 
Morris has received several awards for her work, including the following:
 2016 "Governor General's Achievement Award for Achievement for Excellence in Community Work & Leadership" (issued in Jamaica)
 2016 "I Believe Initiative Ambassador" (issued in Jamaica)
 2017 "30-Under-30 Emerging Leaders/Change Makers Award" (issued in Washington, D.C.)
 2017 "Prime Minister's Youth Award for Excellence in Leadership" (issued in Jamaica)

References

External links 
 Official website 
 Official website of Jamaica Intensive Reading Clinic 
 Official Facebook page
 Official Twitter account

1990 births
Living people
Jamaican educators
Jamaican women academics
Women motivational speakers